Stanley Jackson was an English cricketer and politician.

Stanley Jackson may also refer to:

Stanley Jackson (American football) (born 1975), quarterback
Stanley Jackson (basketball) (born 1970), basketball player
Stanley Jackson (filmmaker) (1914–1981), film director, commentary writer and narrator with National Film Board of Canada